Fiugalu Eteuati Eteuati is a Samoan politician and former Member of the Legislative Assembly of Samoa. He is a member of the Human Rights Protection Party.

Eteuati was first elected to parliament at the 2021 Samoan general election. His election was challenged in an election petition by defeated HRPP member Tafua Maluelue Tafua. On 5 July 2021 the Supreme Court of Samoa found him guilty of 13 counts of bribery and treating, and voided his election.

References

Living people
Members of the Legislative Assembly of Samoa
Human Rights Protection Party politicians
Year of birth missing (living people)